Lebanon Historic District and variations may refer to:

in the United States
(by state then city)
Lebanon Green Historic District, Lebanon, Connecticut, listed on the National Register of Historic Places (NRHP) in New London County 
Lebanon Historic District (Lebanon, Illinois), NRHP-listed
Lebanon Historic Commercial District (Lebanon, Kentucky), listed on the NRHP in Marion County 
Lebanon Junction Historic District, Lebanon Junction, Kentucky, listed on the NRHP in Bullitt County
West Lebanon Historic District, listed on the NRHP in York County
New Lebanon Historic District, New Lebanon, Missouri, listed on the NRHP in Cooper County
Lebanon Historic District (New Jersey), listed on the NRHP in Hunterdon County
Lebanon Commercial District (Lebanon, Ohio), a historic district listed on the NRHP in Warren County
Lebanon Commercial Historic District (Lebanon, Tennessee), NRHP-listed

See also
Cedars of Lebanon State Park Historic District, Lebanon, Tennessee, NRHP-listed
Lebanon Commercial Historic District (disambiguation)